The Bhandari community is a caste that  inhabits the western coast of India. Their traditional occupation was "toddy tapping". They form the largest caste group in the state of Goa, reportedly being over 30% of that state's Hindu population, and play a major role in deciding the future of any political party there.

History 
Although the word "Bhandari" is derived from the Sanskrit word "Mandharale", which means "distiller", Bhandaris prefer derivation from Bhandar, which means treasury, because they used to be treasury guards in the past.

During Shivaji Maharaj's  time, Maynak Bhandari was a chief Admiral.

Traditionally their occupation was drawing toddy from palm plants. Historical evidence suggests that they were foot soldiers in the Maratha Empire and British Indian Army. The famous "Hetkaris" in the army of Shivaji Maharaj were Bhandaris. Bhandaris are divided into various sub-castes such as Kitte, Hetkari, Thale and Gavad. During British Raj, Bhandaris lacked unity among various sub-castes and the differences within these sub-jatis hindered the community progress. The leaders of these sub-castes established their independent caste associations. A Bhandari author from the British era says that they were traditionally active in teaching and learning, and were involved in setting up schools for all castes either in temples or outside someone's house. He says that the community should not blame brahmins for lack of their education as they did not avail educational opportunities in the British era.

In 1878, the British colonial government passed a law that would enable them to control liquor market in India and maximize profit. This resulted in low quality liquor flooding the market. In protest, the Bhandari community - whose traditional occupation was to ferment toddy - declined to supply Toddy to the government.

Affirmative Action
Bhandaris are included in the list of Other Backward Classes (OBCs) in Goa. This provides them with certain rights under India's scheme of affirmative action, such as reservation of positions in government employment and admission to professional colleges. They are also classified as OBCs in Maharashtra.

Varna status
During the British era, in the 19th century, Bhandaris faced discrimination in education as they did not belong to the twice-born varna.

M.R.Bodas, a Brahmin pleader, published an article in Chitramay jagat(1922) where he opined that Bhandari caste was of Shudra origin. This received strong response in another article where the author claimed that the community existed from the era of Mahabharata and that the Bhandaris were originally from Rajputana and were Kshatriya converts to Jainism whose occupation was trading. The author mentioned Sati and Jauhar  as proof for their heritage. The article by Bodas piqued the Bhandari community and the community members met in 1922 to address the issue. Tukaram Padaval, who belonged to Bhandari caste and a close associate of Jyotiba Phule, said that the claim to Kshatriya status was common among many upper and lower castes but there was no certainty at all as to who among them are the original Kshatriyas.

See also
People of the Konkan Division
Bhandari Militia

References

Further reading

Social groups of Goa
Indian castes
Konkani
Social groups of Maharashtra